Pontophaedusa is a genus of small air-breathing land snails, terrestrial pulmonate gastropod mollusk in the family Clausiliidae, the door snails. It is within the subfamily Serrulininae.

Species
Species within the genus Pontophaedusa include:
 Pontophaedusa funiculum

References

 AnimalBase info

Clausiliidae